Thalia Hall is an historic building in Pilsen, Chicago, Illinois, U.S. which is currently a  mixed-use music, retail, and bar/restaurant space. It was designated as a Chicago Landmark on October 25, 1989.

Thalia Hall was  built in 1892 by  saloonkeeper  John Dusek, and designed by architects Frederick Faber and  William Pagels in the Romanesque Revival style.

Its current owners, as of 2018, are Bruce Finkelman and Craig Golden, through their firm  16” on Center.

References

Chicago Landmarks
Lower West Side, Chicago
1892 establishments in Illinois
Buildings and structures completed in 1892
Romanesque Revival architecture in Illinois
Theatres in Chicago